Gulnur may refer to:

 Gülnur Muradoğlu, British professor of finance 
 Gülnur Tumbat (born 1975), Turkish academic of marketing and mountaineer
 Gülnur Yerlisu (born 1969), European champion Turkish Taekwondo practitioner